Gumshoe is a type of shoe, also known as galoshes

Gumshoe may also refer to:

 Gumshoe, a slang term for a private detective, from those that wore street shoes with a thick, soft and quiet rubber sole
 Gumshoe (film), Stephen Frears's 1971 directorial debut
 Gumshoe (video game), a 1986 Nintendo shooter
 Gumshoe, the Hardboiled Detective in the 30s, a 1981 book-based game published by Sleuth Publications
 Gumshoe Awards, an American award for popular crime fiction literary works
 Gumshoe System, a tabletop role-playing game system designed for investigative scenarios
 Dick Gumshoe, a character in the 2001 video game, Ace Attorney

See also 
 Gum boot
 Gum (disambiguation)